Galloisiana chujoi is a species of cave-dwelling insect in the family Grylloblattidae that is endemic to southern Japan. Its type locality is Oninoiwaya Cave, Japan.

References

Grylloblattidae
Insects of Japan
Endemic fauna of Japan
Cave insects